Neeraj Kushawaha is an Indian politician and an ex -member of the Legislative Assembly of Uttar Pradesh in India. Neeraj Kushawaha has been an MLA for two terms(2007-2012 & 2012-2017) 15th and 16th Legislative assembly. He represents the Jalalabad constituency of Uttar Pradesh and is a member of the Bharatiya Janata Party political party.

Early life and education
Neeraj Kushawaha was born in Samesi Lucknow. He attended the Vidyant Hindu PG College and attained Bachelor's degree.

Political career
Neeraj Kushawaha has been an MLA for two terms. He represented the Jalalabad constituency and was a member of the Bahujan Samaj Party political party.

Posts held

See also
 Jalalabad (UP Assembly constituency)
 Sixteenth Legislative Assembly of Uttar Pradesh
 Uttar Pradesh Legislative Assembly

References 

Bahujan Samaj Party politicians from Uttar Pradesh
Uttar Pradesh MLAs 2007–2012
Uttar Pradesh MLAs 2012–2017
People from Shahjahanpur district
1969 births
Living people